The Wind-Del Velodrome is a  outdoor bicycle racing track located in Windham Centre, Ontario, and is one of only three velodromes in the province. The surface is asphalt, and the corners are banked 13 degrees. It was constructed in 1972 by Belgian immigrants to the area. Though the track is not often used, funds for demolition are not available. In addition to hosting the 2001 Ontario Provincial Track Championships, it has been used as an amphitheater and host for recumbent bicycle races. With the opening of the Mattamy National Cycling Centre in Milton, Ontario, proposals have been made to upgrade the Win-Del Velodrome and use it as a training facility.

References

Sports venues in Ontario
Velodromes in Ontario